Kuruçay, formerly and still informally called Kafersarı, is a village in the Oğuzeli District, Gaziantep Province, Turkey. The village is inhabited by Turkmens and Abdals of the Kurular tribe.

References

Villages in Oğuzeli District